61 Virginis (abbreviated 61 Vir) is the Flamsteed designation of a G-type main-sequence star (G7V) slightly less massive than the Sun (which has a hotter G2V spectral type), located  away in the constellation of Virgo. The composition of this star is nearly identical to the Sun.

61 Virginis (G7V) is the first well-established main-sequence star very similar to the Sun with a potential Super-Earth, though it was preceded by CoRoT-7 (a borderline orange dwarf).

Description
61 Virginis is a fifth-magnitude G-type main-sequence star with a stellar classification of G7 V. It is faint but visible to the naked eye south and east of the bright star Spica in the zodiac constellation of Virgo. The designation 61 Virginis originated in the star catalogue of English astronomer John Flamsteed, as part of his Historia Coelestis Britannica. An 1835 account of Flamsteed's work by English astronomer Francis Baily noted that the star showed a proper motion. This made the star of interest for parallax studies, and by 1950 a mean annual value of 0.006″ was obtained. The present day result, obtained with data from the Hipparcos satellite, gives a parallax of 116.89 mas, which corresponds to a physical separation of 27.9 light years from the Sun.

This star is similar in physical properties to the Sun, with around 95% of the Sun's mass, 98% of the radius, and 85% of the Luminosity. The abundance of elements is also similar to the Sun, with the star having an estimated 95% of the Sun's proportion of elements other than hydrogen and helium. It is older than the Sun at around 6.1–6.6 billion years of age, and is spinning with a leisurely projected rotational velocity of 4 km/s at the equator. On average, there is only a low level of activity in the stellar chromosphere and it is a candidate for being in a Maunder minimum state. But the star was suspected as variable in 1988, and a burst of activity was observed between Julian days [24]54800 (29 November 2008) and 55220 (23 January 2010).

The space velocity components of this star are U = –37.9, V = –35.3 and W = –24.7 km/s. 61 Vir is orbiting through the Milky Way galaxy at a distance of 6.9 kpc from the core, with an eccentricity of 0.15. It is believed to be a member of the disk population.

Planetary system
The ecliptic of the 61 Virginis system, as inferred from its dust disc, is inclined to the Solar system at 77°. The star itself is probably inclined at 72°.

In 1988, a study surmised that 61 Virginis was a "possible variable", but no companions were then found. A subsequent study, over eleven years, also failed to find any companion up to the mass of Jupiter and out to 3 AU.

On 14 December 2009, scientists announced the discovery of three planets with minimum masses between 5 and 25 times that of Earth orbiting 61 Virginis. The three planets all orbit very near the star; when compared to the orbits of the planets in the Solar System, all three would orbit inside that of Venus. The outermost of these three, 61 Virginis d, had not yet been confirmed in the HARPS data as of 2012.

A survey with the Spitzer Space Telescope revealed an excess of infrared radiation at a wavelength of 160 μm. This indicated the presence of a debris disk in orbit around the star. This disk was resolved at 70 μm. It was then thought to correspond to an inner radius of 96 AU from the star and outer radius at 195 AU; it is now constrained 30 to over 100 AU. The total mass of the disk is  the mass of the Earth.

On 27 November 2012, the European Space Agency declared that the debris disc (like that of the Gliese 581 planetary system) has "at least 10 times" as many comets as does the Solar system.

As of 2012, "planets more massive than Saturn orbiting within 6 AU" were ruled out. The ESA has further ruled out Saturn-mass planets beyond that.

Additional data is needed to confirm the possibility of more sub-Saturn planets between 0.5 (really, 0.3) and 30 AU from the star. An Earth-mass planet in the star's habitable zone (which would still be too small to detect with current technology) remains possible.

61 Virginis d
61 Virginis d (abbreviated 61 Vir d, also designated HD 115617 d) is a candidate exoplanet orbiting 61 Virginis. 61 Virginis d would have a minimum mass of 22.9 times that of Earth and orbits nearly one-half the distance to the star as Earth orbits the Sun with an eccentricity of 0.35. This planet would most likely be a gas giant like Uranus and Neptune.

This planet was discovered on 14 December 2009 using a precise radial velocity method taken at Keck and Anglo-Australian Observatories. As of 2012 it had not been confirmed by measurements from HARPS, and a 2021 study found it to likely be a false positive, but a 2023 study did detect it based on an additional 10 years of radial velocity data.

View from 61 Virginis 
The Sun is barely visible from the system as a small star close to the much brighter Sirius. Arcturus (magnitude −1.01) is the brightest star of the night sky.

See also 
 List of star systems within 25–30 light-years
 List of stars in Virgo
 Lists of exoplanets

References

External links 
 
 61 Virginis at SolStation
 Systemic Blog article with comparative map of orbits of 61 Vir b, c and d
 Aladin image of 61 Virginis

 
G-type main-sequence stars
Virginis, 061
Maunder Minimum
Planetary systems with two confirmed planets

Virgo (constellation)
BD-17 3813
Virginis, 061
0506
115617
064924
5019